Combined diesel or gas (CODOG) is a type of propulsion system for ships that need a maximum speed that is considerably faster than their cruise speed, particularly warships like modern frigates or corvettes.

For every propeller shaft there is one diesel engine for cruising speed and one geared gas turbine for high speed dashes. Both are connected to the shaft with clutches; only one system is driving the ship, in contrast to CODAG systems that can use the combined power output of both. The advantage of CODOG is a simpler gearing compared to CODAG, but it needs either more powerful or additional gas turbines to achieve the same maximum power output. The disadvantage of CODOG is that the fuel consumption at high speed is poor compared to CODAG.

CODOG vessels 
MGB 2009, a modified Motor Gun Boat of the Royal Navy (1947), and
The two German torpedo boats Pfeil and Strahl (Vosper class, 1963-65)
The US Navy s (built 1966-1971)
The  US Coast Guard s (from 1967)
s of the Royal Canadian Navy
s, and
s of the German Navy
s of the Philippine Navy
s of the Royal Australian Navy (RAN) and Royal New Zealand Navy (RNZN)
other MEKO type frigates or corvettes
s of the Royal Danish Navy
s of the South Korean Navy
s of the Swedish Navy
s of the Indian Navy
s of the Brazilian Navy
 of the Bangladesh Navy
s of the Russian and Vietnamese Navies
118 WallyPower, luxury yacht

Marine propulsion